Native Tongue is the fourth studio album by American glam metal band Poison, released in 1993 through Capitol Records. It peaked at #16 on the Billboard 200, #20 on the UK Albums Chart
and was certified Gold by the RIAA on April 21, 1993. It has also been certified by CAN platinum. This is the only album to feature lead guitarist Richie Kotzen. Kotzen was hired as the band's guitarist following the firing of C.C. DeVille in late 1991. The album features the singles "Stand", "Until You Suffer Some (Fire And Ice)" and "Body Talk".

Production and marketing 
Admitted as a full-fledged member of the band rather than a "hired gun", Kotzen was given considerable creative freedom. Resultingly, Kotzen's writing and performing contributions dominated the album.

Kotzen would later be expelled from the band following the world tour, after it was discovered that he had been romantically involved with the fiancee of drummer Rikki Rockett. Recollections of the album, while no doubt soured by these events, nonetheless appear to faithfully reflect the basic clash between Kotzen's style and that of the band's founding members. Kotzen would later claim that "being in Poison helped me forget I was a musician" while Rockett would lament the loss of the band's original "attitude" 

The album was recorded and mixed at A&M Studios in Hollywood, California, and Rumbo Recorders in Canoga Park, California with producer Richie Zito. It was dedicated to Van Halen tour manager Scotty Ross and former Poison guitarist DeVille. The album peaked at #16 on the Billboard chart.

The first two singles "Stand" and "Until You Suffer Some (Fire And Ice)" featured music videos and charted in the US and the UK. "Stand" reached number 15 on the Mainstream rock chart, #35 on the Top 40 Mainstream chart and #50 on the Billboard Hot 100. The song also charted at number 25 on the UK Singles chart and "Until You Suffer Some (Fire And Ice)" peaked at number 32 on the UK Singles chart.

Following the album the band released a video/DVD titled Seven Days Live which featured a concert from the Native Tongue world tour.

Songs 
Lyrically, the band continued on the growing sophistication that began in Flesh & Blood. The album's themes include battles against injustice ("Scream", "Stand"), heartbreak ("Until You Suffer Some", "7 Days Over You", "Theatre of the Soul"), and inner demons ("Stay Alive").

"When The Whip Comes Down" is a track not included on the album but used as a B-side for the singles.

Track listing

Band members 
 Bret Michaels - Lead Vocals; Acoustic and Rhythm Guitar; Harmonica
 Richie Kotzen - Lead Guitar; Piano; Mandolin; Dobro; Bass Guitar; Backing Vocals
 Bobby Dall - Bass Guitars; Backing Vocals
 Rikki Rockett - Drums; tribal drums, Percussion

 
With:
 Jai Winding - Piano (Tracks 3 & 11)
 Billy Powell - Piano (8 & 15)
 Mike Finnigan - Organ (5)
 Tower of Power - Horns (8)
 Timothy B. Schmit - Backing Vocals
 Tommy Funderburk - Backing Vocals
 First AME Church Choir (3)
 Sheila E. - Percussion (1 & 2)

Charts

Certifications

References 

Poison (American band) albums
1993 albums
Albums produced by Richie Zito
Blues rock albums by American artists
Albums recorded at A&M Studios